Deep Valley is a 1947 drama starring Ida Lupino and Dane Clark, directed by Jean Negulesco and produced and released by Warner Bros. A young woman lives unhappily with her embittered parents in an isolated rural home until an escaped convict changes her dreary existence. It was based on the novel of the same name by Dan Totheroh.

Synopsis
A young woman, Libby Saul (Ida Lupino), lives with her parents, who are themselves estranged, on an isolated farm not far from the California coast. Libby is used by her parents as a diplomatic middle-man because they no longer speak to each other directly. She has developed a stammer over the years, and spends a lot of her spare time wandering around in the nearby woods with her beloved dog, Joe. One day when she is out wandering, she bumps into a group of convicts who are building a road along the coastline. She takes an interest in the convicts and their building, so she returns for several days, without her parents knowing, to watch them at a distance. She is particularly interested in one of the handsome young convicts, Barry Burnette (Dane Clark).

Eventually the convicts work their way through the hill that stands between them and Libby's parents' farm. They approach the farm in search of fresh water from the farm well. Mr. Saul (Henry Hull), Libby's father, offers to sell water to them, but they turn the offer down. Mr. Saul decides to give them the water for free instead. The foreman (Jack Mower) of the road workers taunts Burnette to the point when he explodes and punches his boss. Burnette is handcuffed, and Libby breaks down in tears over the man's unfortunate fate. One of the young men working with the convicts, Jeff Barker (Wayne Morris), is an engineer, who is fresh out of the army. Mr. Saul invites Barker to the farm for dinner one night, and Mrs. Saul (Fay Bainter) wants the engineer to befriend her daughter, hoping that he would take an interest in her and ultimately want to marry her. Libby and Barker strike up a conversation, but because Libby is very interested in the fate of young Burnette, she asks the engineer what is going to happen to him. Barker replies that Burnette will be sent back to San Quentin for the attack on the foreman.

Barker asks Libby to come dancing with him, but she is too shy to accept his invitation. Mr. Saul is disappointed in his daughter's reluctance towards Barker, and after the engineer leaves the farm, he slaps Libby in her face. This brings Libby over the top, and she tells her parents that she won't live like that anymore, with their hatred against each other, and she runs away from home that very night.

When Libby has left, Mrs. Saul is forced to get up from her bed and go downstairs to communicate with her husband for the first time in many years. Libby and her dog make camp in a nearby cabin, and not long after they arrive, during a heavy rainstorm, Burnette joins her. He has escaped from the prison transport and comes to the cabin to seek refuge and hide. Libby, who is attracted to him, offers to help him get away. Burnette tells Libby of the reason for his imprisonment: He was arrested for fighting while he was enlisted in the Navy. Later he committed a robbery while he was drunk, and a man was accidentally killed. After this incident, he was sent to San Quentin, convicted for manslaughter.

Libby and Burnette make a plan to elope to San Francisco together, but Libby has to go to the farm to get some clothes and supplies on the way. When she comes home she finds, to her surprise, that her parents have reconciled. They tell her that there is a posse out looking for Burnette to bring him back to prison. The posse arrives at the farm while Libby is there, and she has no way of escaping and returning to Burnette in the cabin. When Burnette doesn't hear from her, he comes to the farm late at night, looking for her. He finds her, and she hides him in the barn, and there, in the night, Libby and Burnette fall hopelessly in love with each other. Libby's parents are not aware that Burnette is hiding in the barn. Later, Burnette is nearly discovered by Barker, who is part of the posse, when he goes out to find a tire pump. Libby intercepts him and saves Burnette at the last second.

Because of Libby's strange behavior, Mrs. Saul begins to suspect that something is wrong and eventually confronts the couple. Burnette and Libby run off just as Mr. Saul and Barker come to take Burnett. When Barker tries to stop them, Burnette knocks him down and drives off in the truck, leaving Libby behind. The rest of the posse follows Burnette, and he is shot and wounded. Burnette's flight is prevented, and he ultimately dies in Libby's arms. Libby and Barker make a new start.

Cast
 Ida Lupino as Libby Saul
 Dane Clark as Barry Burnette
 Wayne Morris as Jeff Barker
 Fay Bainter as Ellie Saul
 Henry Hull as Cliff Saul
 Willard Robertson as Sheriff Akers
 Rory Mallinson as Foreman
 Jack Mower as Supervisor
 John Alvin as Convict

Production
The film was shot in Big Bear Lake, California.

Reception
The New York Times praised the actors but criticized the plot: “It's just a highly incredible...attempt at tempestuous drama. But the film is very well acted...With a more credibly defined story to support the performances, Deep Valley might easily have become an arresting picture.”

Film critic Dennis Schwartz generally likes the film. He wrote: "A slow paced, b&w, atmospheric melodrama, set in the mountains of northern California, about a farm girl, Libby Saul (Ida Lupino), romanced by an escaped convict, Barry Burnette (Dane Clark)...The interesting part of the film revolves around the conflict Libby faces of running away with the violent fugitive she has fallen madly in love with or to have a secure marriage with the really nice engineer, someone she doesn't love. Deep Valley offers a melodramatic look at how love can make one feel alive again. The film comes to a boil with its very moving conclusion, after a very slow start."

References

External links
 
 
 
 
 Deep Valley information site and DVD review at DVD Beaver (includes images)

1947 films
1947 drama films
American black-and-white films
Film noir
Films based on American novels
Films directed by Jean Negulesco
Films scored by Max Steiner
Films shot in Big Bear Lake, California
American drama films
1940s English-language films
Warner Bros. films
1940s American films